Buoyancy compensator may refer to:

Buoyancy compensator (diving)
Buoyancy compensator (aviation)